Tangle Teezer is a British company that manufactures hair care products, most notably hairbrushes. It was founded by  Shaun Pulfrey, a hairdresser, and its first product was launched in 2007. The first and signature product, a detangling hairbrush dubbed "The Original," eventually went on to achieve cult popularity and received several accolades for its innovation.

History 
Tangle Teezer was founded by its inventor Shaun Pulfrey, who started a hair colorist career in 1978. He worked at Pierre Alexandre, Toni&Guy, Nicky Clarke, and Richard Ward salons throughout his career. In 2002 Pulfrey published I Wanna Be Blonde, a book sharing his insider hair coloring tips.

In 2003, Pulfrey began to research and develop his idea for a detangling hairbrush to create the world’s first professional detangling tool. In 2005 Pulfrey remortgaged his flat in Brixton, London, to finance the product launch.

Pulfrey appeared on Dragons’ Den in 2007. He pitched 'The Original' detangling hairbrush to Peter Jones, Duncan Bannatyne, James Caan and Deborah Meaden. Pulfrey offered 15% of Tangle Teezer for £80,000 but was rejected. Jones labeled the brushes ‘hair-brained’, Caan said they were a ‘waste of time,’ and Bannatyne said he wanted to ‘pull [his] hair out.’ However, when the episode was aired, the Tangle Teezer website crashed due to public demand, with 1,500 orders placed. In 2008, Boots began stocking the brushes, and by 2009, the brand had turned a profit and started to expand into a global market.

References

2007 establishments in the United Kingdom